Lobby Hero is a play by Kenneth Lonergan. It premiered Off-Broadway in 2001.

Production history
Lobby Hero premiered Off-Broadway at Playwrights Horizons, on March 13, 2001, and closed on April 15, 2001, reopening at the John Houseman Theatre on May 8, 2001, and closing on September 2, 2001. The cast featured Glenn Fitzgerald as Jeff, Heather Burns as Dawn, with Tate Donovan as Bill, and Dion Graham as William. Directed by Mark Brokaw.

The UK première was staged at the Donmar Warehouse, in previews on April 4, opening April 10 and closing on May 4, 2002. The cast included 
David Tennant (Jeff), Charlotte Randle (Dawn), with Dominic Rowan (Bill), and Gary McDonald (William), and was again directed by Mark Brokaw. This production transferred to the New Ambassadors Theatre from June 26 (opening July 1) to August 10, 2002.

A revival opened on Broadway on March 26, 2018, at the Helen Hayes Theatre, starring Michael Cera (Jeff), Bel Powley (Dawn), with Chris Evans (Bill), and Brian Tyree Henry (William). The production, directed by Trip Cullman, ran until May.13, 2018.

Synopsis
The show follows a security guard in his late 20s, his strict supervisor, and an overbearing cop and his rookie female partner. The show is set in a foyer of a middle-income Manhattan apartment building in the middle of the night.

Character summaries
Jeff - 27-year-old security guard, unsuccessful with women
Dawn - a female police officer in her 20s
Bill - Dawn's senior partner, who shows a romantic interest in her
William - Jeff's African-American boss

Reviews
Toby Young said in a review in The Spectator, "Lobby Hero is a fantastic play but I'd be hard pushed to say why. You can tell it's good because, within about five minutes, any sense you have of being a member of the audience, sitting down and watching a group of actors perform on stage, has vanished.... In what amounts to an out-of-body experience, you're totally absorbed in what's going on...Lonergan is particularly good, both here and in This Is Our Youth, at showing how good intentions can be undermined by unconscious desires. Few of his characters are capable of resisting their own malignant impulses."

In her review of the 2018 revival, Marilyn Stasio wrote: "Set in the lobby of a generic Manhattan apartment building, the play looks both kindly and critically upon the kind of characters Lonergan loves to write: working-class stiffs, generally decent people who are unexpectedly challenged by issues of ethics....Helmer Trip Cullman does his best work with small, tight ensembles like this one, so there’s no slack in the emotional tension and no escape from the sticky web that even nice people get tangled up in when they tell lies – especially the lies they tell themselves."

Awards and nominations

2018 Broadway revival

References

2001 plays
Plays by Kenneth Lonergan
Plays set in New York City